The Cloister and the Hearth is a 1913 British silent historical film directed by Cecil M. Hepworth and starring Alec Worcester, Alma Taylor and Hay Plumb. It is an adaptation of Charles Reade's 1861 novel The Cloister and the Hearth.

Cast
 Alec Worcester as Gerard Eliasson  
 Alma Taylor as Margaret 
 Hay Plumb as Denys  
 Jamie Darling as Elias Eliasson  
 Ruby Belasco as Mrs. Eliasson  
 Harry Buss as Hans

References

Bibliography
 Goble, Alan. The Complete Index to Literary Sources in Film. Walter de Gruyter, 1999.

External links

1913 films
1910s historical films
British historical films
British silent feature films
Films directed by Cecil Hepworth
Films set in the 15th century
Films set in the Holy Roman Empire
Films set in the Netherlands
Films based on British novels
Hepworth Pictures films
British black-and-white films
1910s English-language films
1910s British films